The 1956 Louisiana gubernatorial election was held on January 17, 1956. Incumbent Governor Robert F. Kennon was ineligible to run for a second term in office. Earl K. Long won the Democratic primary, which was tantamount to election, securing his second full term as Governor of Louisiana. He received over 50% of the vote, defeating his opponents so soundly that no runoff vote was needed. His closest competitor was New Orleans mayor deLesseps Story Morrison.

Background 
Like most Southern states between the Reconstruction Era and the Civil Rights Movement, Louisiana's Republican Party was virtually nonexistent in terms of electoral support.  This meant that the Democratic Party primary held on this date was the real contest over who would be governor.

Outgoing Governor Robert F. Kennon was constitutionally barred from succeeding himself.

Democratic primary

Candidates
Francis Grevemberg, State Police Superintendent
Earl K. Long, former Governor (1939-40, 1948–52) of Winnfield
James M. McLemore, Alexandria cattleman and candidate for Governor in 1952
deLesseps Morrison, Mayor of New Orleans since 1946
Fred Preaus, former Director of Highways, a car dealer and former member of the Farmerville Town Council

Campaign
Long's campaign promises included spending increases to fund health, education, and other social programs.  He made these promises on an extensive tour of the state, stopping in nearly every town to deliver theatrical speeches mocking his opponents.  The acerbic  Long attacked Morrison with particular enthusiasm, mocking his toupee and fancy suits and calling him "as slick as a peeled onion", out of touch with residents of small towns and rural areas.  Long also mocked his unusual first name: "Ole De la Soups is the only man that can talk out of both sides of his mouth, whistle, and strut all at once."   In addition to his usual base, Long also won support from corrupt rural sheriffs who were angry at their loss of gambling revenues after Kennon's reforms and Grevemberg's raids.

Despite the reluctance of Morrison's own Crescent City Democratic Association, the New Orleans mayor was overly optimistic at his chances.  Morrison had expected the support of Governor Kennon, but did not get it; Morrison had endorsed Kennon's opponent Hale Boggs in the first primary of the 1952 election.  Long encouraged false optimism in Morrison's campaign by having his rural supporters write to the New Orleans mayor urging him to run for governor. This false rural support never materialized in the actual election; Morrison was too unfamiliar with the state's rural politics and fought a perception of urban sophistication that did not play well in the country.  His emphasis on his record as mayor and his promises of economic development found little resonance with rural voters.

Preaus, running third, had the support of incumbent Governor Kennon.

Grevemberg campaigned on his reputation for integrity, but his gambling crackdown had alienated too many people for him to receive much support.

McLemore ran a segregationist campaign as he had in 1952.

Results

Earl Long won 62 of the state's 64 parishes; only Orleans Parish went to Morrison.  The support of local political boss Leander Perez won Plaquemines Parish for Fred Preaus, who lost his own Union Parish. Long was intensely proud of his first-primary victory, exclaiming "Huey never done that!"

Sources 
Haas, Edward F. DeLesseps S.  Morrison and the Image of Reform: New Orleans Politics, 1946-60. LSU Press, 1974.

Kurtz, Michael and Morgan Peoples. Earl K. Long:  The Saga of Uncle Earl and Louisiana Politics.  LSU Press, 1990.

Louisiana Secretary of State.   Democratic Primary Election Returns, 1956.

1956
Louisiana
Gubernatorial
Louisiana gubernatorial election